Some Nights may refer to:
Some Nights (album), a 2012 album by fun. 
"Some Nights" (song), a song from the album
"Some Nights" (Taeyeon song), a 2022 song from Taeyeon's third album INVU